ST Format was a computer magazine in the UK covering the Atari ST during the late 1980s and early 1990s. Like other members of the Future plc Format stable - PC Format and Amiga Format, for instance, it combined software and hardware reviews with columnists, letters pages and a cover disk.

The magazine was launched in 1989 when its predecessor, the short-lived ST/Amiga Format was split into two separate publications. Most of the staff went on to work at ST Format with Amiga Format essentially being a whole new magazine.

Later on, the magazine was kept alive by enthusiastic freelancers such as Frank Charlton and Andy Curtis, as well as dedicated staff writers and editors such as Clive Parker and Nick Peers.

ST Format continued publication until 1996, when production of the Atari ST and Atari Falcon computers was all but over. The final issue was published in September 1996, and was the eighty-sixth issue of the magazine. Fan sites for the magazine still exist on the internet, some featuring archives of features from the magazines.

References

External links
 The ST Format Shrine
 ST Format Cover Images
 Archived ST Format magazines on the Internet Archive

1989 establishments in the United Kingdom
1996 disestablishments in the United Kingdom
Atari ST magazines
Defunct computer magazines published in the United Kingdom
Magazines established in 1989
Magazines disestablished in 1996
Mass media in Bath, Somerset
Monthly magazines published in the United Kingdom
Video game magazines published in the United Kingdom